Loro is an East Kainji language of Toro LGA, Bauchi State, Nigeria belonging to the Shammo cluster.

References

East Kainji languages
Languages of Nigeria